WGPS may refer to:

 WGPS-LD, a low-power television station (channel 21, virtual 22) licensed to serve Fort Myers, Florida, United States
 WVRL, a radio station (88.3 FM) licensed to serve Elizabeth City, North Carolina, United States, which held the call sign WGPS from 2002 to 2010